The Antics Roadshow is an hour-long 2011 documentary film focused on iconic acts of activism and pranks.

Production
The Antics Roadshow was produced and directed by the British street artist Banksy and the director/producer Jaimie D'Cruz and was narrated by Kathy Burke.

The name parodies the BBC Television series, Antiques Roadshow.

Featured artists and activists

Broadcasts

References

External links

Street artists
British television documentaries
Works by Banksy